Kevin Kellin (born November 16, 1959) is a former American football defensive tackle. He played for the Tampa Bay Buccaneers from 1986 to 1988.

References

1959 births
Living people
American football defensive tackles
Minnesota Golden Gophers football players
Tampa Bay Buccaneers players